Expatriation Act may refer to:
Expatriation Act of 1862, Kentucky law stripping Confederate soldiers of citizenship
Expatriation Act of 1868, United States law reiterating right of renunciation of citizenship
Expatriation Act of 1907, United States law providing for loss of citizenship by Americans residing abroad
Enemy Expatriation Act of 2012, United States bill providing for denationalization for "enemy combatants"

See also
Ex-PATRIOT Act of 2012, United States bill which would bar former citizens from re-entry